Raphael Bronstein (June 25, 1896 – November 4, 1988) was a violinist and violin professor.

Early life
He was born in a Jewish family in Vilnius, Lithuania and studied violin with Leopold Auer at the St. Petersburg Conservatory. He arrived in the United States in 1923 to take a job as an assistant to Auer. Mr. Bronstein had one daughter, Ariana Bronne, who taught at the Manhattan School of Music.

Career
Mr. Bronstein's teaching career spanned 65 years and was responsible for a large number of the current generation of leading violin teachers and performers. He taught at the Hartt School in Hartford, Boston University, Manhattan School of Music, Queens College and the Graduate Center of the City University of New York. He is remembered annually at the Manhattan School of Music with the Raphael Bronstein Award. Bronstein's students have included Elmar Oliveira, Margaret Jones Wiles, Michael Ludwig, Martha Strongin Katz, Lya Stern, Jay Zhong, Kerry McDermott, Judith Morse, Estelle Kerner, Richard Auldon Clark and his own daughter Ariana Bronne.  Daniel Kobialka and Phillip Ruder are also among Bronstein's most noteworthy students.

He founded and conducted the Bronstein Symphonietta in 1949. He wrote the Science of Violin Playing.

Later life
He died at St. Luke's Hospital in Manhattan, New York City on November 4, 1988.

References

Further reading
 Applebaum, Samuel. The way they play, Paganiniana Publications, 1984.
 Press, Jaques Cattell. Who's Who in American music. Classical, 1st edition, R. R. Bowker, 1983.

1890s births
1988 deaths
American male violinists
Violin pedagogues
Lithuanian emigrants to the United States
Classical violinists from the Russian Empire
Jewish classical musicians
University of Hartford Hartt School faculty
Boston University faculty
Manhattan School of Music faculty
City University of New York faculty
20th-century classical violinists
20th-century American male musicians
Male classical violinists
20th-century American violinists